A by-election was held in the New South Wales state electoral district of Wagga Wagga on 8 September 2018. The by-election was triggered by the resignation of Daryl Maguire, a Liberal-turned-independent. Maguire resigned from Parliament the previous month after admitting to a corruption inquiry that he sought payment over a property deal.

The day after the vote ABC election expert Antony Green predicted the by-election would be won by independent candidate Joe McGirr. McGirr was later confirmed as the victorious candidate by the New South Wales Electoral Commission, winning 59.6% of the two-candidate preferred vote over Liberal candidate Julia Ham. The Liberal primary vote plunged by more than 28% – a loss of more than half of its primary vote from 2015–resulting in the seat falling out of Liberal hands for the first time since 1957. McGirr only trailed the Liberals by 28 votes on the first count, and was elected on Labor preferences.

The by-election came two weeks after two federal Liberal leadership spills on 21 and 24 August, which resulted in the removal of Prime Minister Malcolm Turnbull. The massive primary vote swing against the Liberals was put down to fallout from the spills. The swing against the Liberals was actually large enough to make this long-standing conservative bastion a notional Labor seat in a "traditional" two-party-preferred contest between the Liberals and Labor for the first time in over 60 years.

Candidates
The Nationals elected not to field a candidate, following considerable debate between the two Coalition partners. Although Wagga Wagga had been held by the Liberals without interruption since 1957, a number of Nationals believed Wagga Wagga was naturally a National seat. It is located within an area that has long been considered National heartland, and is mostly served by the safe federal National seat of Riverina.

Results

Daryl Maguire, (/) resigned.

See also
Electoral results for the district of Wagga Wagga
List of New South Wales state by-elections

References

External links
ABC Elections: Wagga Wagga by-election
NSW Electoral Commission: Wagga Wagga by-election

2018 elections in Australia
New South Wales state by-elections